Sue Youcef Nabi (born 13 February 1968) is an Algerian-born French entrepreneur and innovator in the world of global beauty. Nabi is the founder of vegan skincare line Orveda, which launched in 2017. Nabi spent 20 years at L’Oreal, including holding the title of President for both Lancôme and L’Oréal.

In July 2020 Sue was named CEO of the American multinational beauty company Coty Inc.

Early life and education

Born to a father who was an engineer, politician and painter, and a French-teaching mother, Nabi grew up in Algeria. After completing an Engineering Degree at the École nationale du génie de l'eau et de l'environnement de Strasbourg (ENGEES), Nabi went on to graduate with an Advanced master's degree in Marketing Management, ESSEC Business School in 1991.

Career at L’Oréal

In 1993, Nabi entered L'Oreal as a Retail Sales Representative, South-West France for Jacques Dessange Professional Hair Care, and was promoted to Mennen Brand Manager (Gemey-Maybelline) in 1994. Between 1996 and 2000, Nabi was made Group Manager/Marketing Director for Gemey-Maybelline, before being promoted to General Manager, L'Oreal France.

In 2005, Nabi became Worldwide President of L’Oréal Paris, and enjoyed various successes and press coverage for growing the business, championing diversity in beauty, and for individualistic, personal charisma. Through the “Because We’re Worth It” testimonials, Nabi re-invented L’Oréal Paris’ advertising and brand equity. Nabi also championed diversity of beauty through the introduction of marketing campaigns that featured, for the first time, Jane Fonda (at 68), brunettes including Penélope Cruz and Eva Longoria, Asian celebrities including Chinese actress Gong Li as well as men - from both Hollywood and TV screens - including Lost’s Matthew Fox and Grey’s Anatomy’s Patrick Dempsey.

Nabi also oversaw a number of key product launches and successes, including Casting Crème Gloss Hair Color and Total Repair 5 hair care line, as well as make-up innovations including Glam Shine, Color Riche lip Colour Star Secrets line, Telescopic and Double Extend mascaras.

In 2009, at the age of 41, Nabi became the Worldwide President of Lancôme, part of the L’Oreal Luxury Products division and a brand that was in decline. During a 5-year presidency, Nabi oversaw the successful launch of many new Lancôme products, most notably the perfume"La Vie est belle”, advertised by Julia Roberts.

Nabi’s credits during presidency also include re-inventing Lancôme’s advertising Image with photographer Mario Testino, signing celebrities including Emma Watson, Lily Collins, as well as the creation and launch of Visionnaire Serum, Génifique Light Pearl Eye Serum, Génifique Serum rel-aunch, Teint Miracle foundations, Hypnose mascaras  and Absolue l’Extrait Super Premium Skincare.

In 2013, Nabi resigned from her position as president of Lancôme, and exited L’Oreal.

2013 to Present

In the wake of resignation, Nabi moved from Paris to London, England. Inspired by Taoism and a personal health journey (one which included Naturopathy and Ayurveda), Nabi spent three years creating and developing Orveda, a skincare line co-founded with friend and business partner, Nicolas Vu.

In July 2020, she was appointed CEO of Coty, taking over from Peter Harf who remained as Chairman.

References

1968 births
Living people
Algerian emigrants to France
French women chief executives
Coty Inc. people
Chief executives in retail